The Badminton competition at the 2010 Central American and Caribbean Games was being held in Mayagüez, Puerto Rico. The tournament was scheduled to be held from 18 to 23 July at the Raymond Dalmau Coliseum in Porta del Sol.

Medal summary

Men's events

Women's events

Mixed events

Results

Men's singles

Women's singles

Men's doubles

Women's doubles

Men's team

Women's team

Mixed doubles

Participants

References

External links

Events at the 2010 Central American and Caribbean Games
Central American and Caribbean Games
July 2010 sports events in North America
2010
Central American and Caribbean Games